May Company California was a chain of department stores operating in Southern California and Nevada, with headquarters in North Hollywood, California. It was a subsidiary of May Department Stores and merged with May's other Southern California subsidiary, J. W. Robinson's, in 1993 to form Robinsons-May.

May Company California was established in 1923 when May acquired A. Hamburger & Sons Inc.. (founded in 1881 by Asher Hamburger). The company operated exclusively in Southern California until 1989 when May Department Stores had dissolved Goldwater's, based in Scottsdale, Arizona, and transferred its Las Vegas, Nevada store to May Company California.

Two well-known stores were the flagship Downtown store on 8th Street between Broadway and Hill streets, and the May Company Wilshire at Wilshire Boulevard and Fairfax Avenue. The 1926 garage building at 9th and Hill Streets was one of the nation's first parking structures (Los Angeles Historic-Cultural Monument No. 1001). The Wilshire location has been featured in several vintage films, including Behave Yourself!

History

A. Hamburger & Sons "The People's Store"

Main St. store
May Company California can trace its roots to the store that Asher Hamburger and his sons Moses, David and Solomon had established in Los Angeles after their recent move from Sacramento. This store first opened on October 29, 1881, in a 20-by-75-foot room on Main Street near Requena Street and was original known as The People's Store.

Spring St. store
In 1882, only one year later, Hamburger's moved to the Ponet-Bumiller Block at 45 N. Spring St. (post-1890 numbering: 145 N. Spring), SW corner of Temple, in a space of 46 by 100 ft. Later, it expanded into the north half of the ground floor of the newly built Phillips Block, NW corner of Spring and Franklin, then in 1887 into the south half. In April 1899 it added the Ponet store 20 ft to the north of the Bumiller Block.

Phillips Block — largest store in the West
In 1899, Hamburger's renovated and took over the entire Phillips Block, all four floors plus the cellar. The space officially opened June 1, 1899 and the store claimed at that time to have  of floor space and to be the largest retail store in the Western United States. Later Hamburger's added an additional  onto its back side on New High St.

1908: An even larger “largest store in the West”
By the start of the 20th century, A. Hamburger & Sons had outgrown its Spring Street location, which had 520 employees working on five floors. The Hamburger family decided to build a much larger store at the southeast corner of Broadway and Eighth, a location that was outside of then current retail district. Construction started in 1905, with a grand opening held in 1908. This location, which was also known as the Great White Store, was the largest department store building west of Chicago at the time and would eventually become the flagship location for the May Company California. At the time that the Great White Store was opened, the store could boast of having one of the first escalators on the West Coast, several restaurants, a drug store, grocery store, bakery, fruit store, meat market, U.S. post office, telegraph office, barber shop, a dentist, a chiropractor, a medical doctor, an auditorium, an electricity and steam power plant in the basement that was large enough to support a city of 50,000 inhabitants, a private volunteer 120 men fire brigade, 13 acres of retail space (482,475 sq.ft., larger than all the department, clothing and dry goods stores in the city), and 1200 employees. The Los Angeles Public Library was also located on the third floor from 1908 until it was forced to move to a larger location when it outgrew the Hamburger space by 1913. For a short time, Woodbury Business College briefly was also located on the fifth floor. Circa 1912, there was a temporary free public menagerie on the fourth floor of 50 animals including a cassowary, a sun bear, an orangutan, a -long python, monkeys and iridescent birds.

Expansion to over one million square feet
The store continued to expand until it took up the entire block bounded by Broadway, Hill, 8th and 9th. In 1923, a nine-story addition was built on Hill Street. In the mid-1920s May Company also built a warehouse at Grand and Jefferson and in 1927 a nine-story parking garage at 9th and Hill streets.

1923: Sale to May
On March 31, 1923, the Hamburgers sold their store to the May family of St. Louis for $8.5 million. Thomas and Wilbur May, sons of the founder of the May Company, were sent to manage the former Hamburger store.  One of the first things that they did was to expand the store again by building adjacent additions on the other parts of the city block. After several more years, the May Company store eventually occupied almost the entire block between Broadway and Hill and between 8th and 9th Streets. The old Hamburger store was officially renamed the May Company in 1927.

1939: first branch, Wilshire Boulevard

To keep pace with the extreme growth in population within Southern California during the Great Depression, May Company opened the first branch store in 1939 on Wilshire at Fairfax at a cost of $2 million.

1947: Crenshaw branch
After World War II, a second branch store was opened on October 10, 1947 along Crenshaw Boulevard at the northeast corner of Santa Barbara St. (now M. L. King, Jr. Blvd.). The store would later be integrated into the Broadway-anchored Crenshaw Plaza directly across the street to the south. 

A proposed store in Hollywood that was planned at the same time was never built.

1952–1992: suburban expansion
From 1952 to 1992 May opened stores across suburban Los Angeles and Southern California (see table below).

1992: Merger into Robinsons-May
On October 17, 1992, May Company California's parent, May Department Stores, announced the merger of May Company California with its sister company J.W. Robinson's to form Robinsons-May, thus ending the May Company California existence. It was also announced that the Wilshire store along with the stores in West Covina, Buena Park, Santa Ana, and San Bernardino were scheduled to close by the end of January 1993.

Disposal of older stores
During the early part of this division existence, May Company was also the developer of some other early shopping centers and malls which grew around the initially stand-alone stores, with the Crenshaw location being the first example.

The first May Company store, the original Hamburger's, at Broadway and 8th in downtown Los Angeles was closed when it was replaced by the just opened 7th Market Place store in 1986. This building is designated as Los Angeles Historic-Cultural Monument No. 459. After its sale, the building was primary used by small clothing manufacturing companies. In 2013, the then current owners were trying to sell the building since the surrounding area is being actively redeveloped. It was announced in April 2014 that Waterbridge Capital agreed to purchase the property, but had not given out too many details on how they might go about to develop it, except to state it would be mixed-use.

During the 1980s, the parent corporation tried to replace the iconic Wilshire store for several years by getting involved with mall development at Farmers Market. However the development that eventually became The Grove at Farmers Market was delayed for nearly two decades. The St. Louis-based parent company eventually withdrew from the project and the Wilshire store was never replaced when May Company California was later merged with Robinson in 1993. After closing, the Streamline Moderne style building was sold to Los Angeles County Museum of Art in 1994 and is currently slated to house The Academy Museum of Motion Pictures.

Store list

Gallery

References in popular culture

On the Jack Benny radio and television programs, Benny was said to have met his girlfriend Mary Livingstone (played by his real-life wife, Sadie Marks) at the May Company when she worked there in the hosiery department.  This is one of the few instances in radio or television history where a real business was made part of the story.  (Jack and Mary Benny actually met through friends and not at a department store.)

In Andre DeToth's 1948 film noir Pitfall, Lizabeth Scott's character, Mona Stevens, is depicted working in the fine dresses department of the May Company's Wilshire Boulevard location.

See also
May Company Building (Broadway, Los Angeles)
May Company Building (Wilshire, Los Angeles)
May Company Building (Mission Valley, San Diego)

References

 
American companies established in 1881
Retail companies established in 1881
Retail companies disestablished in 1993